Cañada Airport,  is a public airport  east of Estación San Antonio de Parapeti (de) in the Santa Cruz Department of Bolivia.

See also

Transport in Bolivia
List of airports in Bolivia

References

External links 
OpenStreetMap -Cañada Airport
OurAirports - Cañada Airport
FallingRain - Cañada Airport

Airports in Santa Cruz Department (Bolivia)